The Dän Tàgé ("Person River", formerly the Indian River) is a river in Yukon Territory, Canada. It is in the Yukon River drainage basin, begins at the uppermost of the Loon Lakes, and is a right tributary of the Teslin River.

References

Rivers of Yukon